Introduction and Allegro for Harp, Flute, Clarinet and String Quartet is a chamber work by Maurice Ravel. It is a short piece, typically lasting between ten and eleven minutes in performance. It was commissioned in 1905 by the Érard harp manufacturers to showcase their instruments, and has been described as a miniature harp concerto. The premiere was in Paris on 22 February 1907. 

The work has been arranged for piano and for large orchestral forces but the version for seven instruments is usually performed, and has been recorded many times. Harpists who have featured in recordings include Lily Laskine, Nicanor Zabaleta, Osian Ellis, Markus Klinko, Lavinia Meijer and Marie-Pierre Langlamet.

Background
To showcase its new chromatic harp, the Pleyel company commissioned Claude Debussy in 1904 to write his Danses sacrée et profane for harp and orchestra. The rival Érard company responded by commissioning Maurice Ravel to write a piece to display the expressive range of its double-action pedal harp.

Ravel completed his Introduction and Allegro for a septet of harp, flute, clarinet and string quartet in June 1905, dedicating it to Albert Blondel, director of Maison Érard. For Ravel, composition was generally slow and painstaking, but he wrote the Introduction and Allegro at what for him was breakneck speed, to complete it before embarking on a boating holiday with friends. He wrote at the time:

Premiere and early performances 
The premiere was given on 22 February 1907 at an all-Ravel concert presented by the Cercle Musical at the Hôtel de la Société française de photographie in Paris. The players were Micheline Kahn (harp), Philippe Gaubert (flute), Ernest Pichard (clarinet), and the Quartet Firmin Touche; the performance was conducted by Charles Domergue.

The British premiere was on 4 September 1907 at a Henry Wood Promenade concert, with Alfred Kastner as harp soloist. Ravel later conducted the work in Britain, first at the Bechstein Hall, London, in December 1913, with Gwendolen Mason as harpist, and in concerts of his works at both the Aeolian Hall, London and the town hall, Oxford in October 1928.

The American premiere was at Aeolian Hall in New York on 3 December 1916 in a concert featuring the harpist Carlos Salzedo, who gave the American premiere of Debussy's Danses sacrée et profane in the same programme. At the first performance in Australia, at the Conservatorium Hall, Sydney, in November 1917, the piece was so enthusiastically received that it had to be immediately repeated.

Music
The full title of the work in the published score gives primacy to the harp:  "Introduction et Allegro pour Harpe avec accompagnement de Quatuor à Cordes, Flûte et Clarinette". Although some commentators have emphasised the chamber nature of the piece, and challenged the view of it as a concertante work, the Ravel scholar Arbie Orenstein writes, "Ravel apparently wished to stress the privileged position of the harp, and the composition should thus be considered a miniature harp concerto rather than a septet".

Structure

The work is in G-flat major. It typically plays for between ten and eleven minutes. The 26-bar introduction presents three themes – the first two for woodwinds and the third for cello – which reappear in the allegro. The piece opens with a pianissimo duet for the flute and clarinet. The strings enter in the third bar, pianissimo, and the harp enters in the fourth with a wide-ranging arpeggio.

The cello introduces a broad melody against the shimmering pianissimo of the violins, flute, and clarinet. The movement becomes faster and louder, and subsides to pianissimo again, bringing the introduction to its conclusion.

The allegro, in sonata form, follows without a break. It opens with a harp solo. The flute takes up the melody, to the accompaniment of the violins pizzicato and the other strings arco. The melody is passed from one instrument to another; the music gradually grows louder until a fortissimo climax is reached. The themes are further developed or compressed, with a cadenza for the harp, which precedes the recapitulation.

The harp returns to the first theme of the allegro section, with the accompaniment of trills by strings and woodwinds. The melody passes from instrument to instrument, the music becoming louder and softer again, with short interludes for the harp solo. The principal melody is given in variation form in the harp, accompanied by pizzicato strings, leading to an animated and fortissimo conclusion.

Arrangements
During Ravel's lifetime, his publisher, Durand et cie, issued, in addition to the original score, arrangements of the Introduction and Allegro for solo piano (by J. Charlot), piano four hands (by L. Roques), two pianos (by the composer), and harp and piano (by the composer). Ravel was not averse to having the piece played by larger ensembles than a septet. in a letter to Désiré-Émile Inghelbrecht in February 1911 he wrote:

Several recordings of the work have the string parts expanded from quartet to full string orchestra.

Critical reception

Comparing Debussy's 1904 Danses sacrée et profane with Ravel's piece commissioned in response, the critic Mark de Voto comments that the former are "restrained and even austere, but no less sensuous in their subtlety, without so much as a hint of the harp’s most characteristic gesture, the glissando", whereas Ravel's is "a brilliant virtuoso piece" with "a lushness of colour" and "a remarkably full instrumental sound". 

In a 2011 study Roger Nichols comments that although Ravel had described the piece as finished "for better or for worse", the musical public "has long decided that it was 'for better'". In Nichols's view the work, from an aesthetic point of view, is a minor one but inhabits an "original and beautiful sound-world" and technically represents an advance on the String Quartet premiered the year before the composition of the Introduction and Allegro. 

In his 2012 Ravel the Decadent, Michael Puri interprets the Introduction and Allegro as "a scene of reanimation" – in the words of another analyst, Jessie Fillerup, "a dawn that heralds renewal while pointing toward the inevitable dusk". Puri considers the music to be the closest relation in Ravel's works to the ballet Daphnis et Chloé, commissioned in 1909.

Recordings
The composer directed an early recording of the work in London in 1923, with an ensemble comprising Gwendolen Mason, harp; Robert Murchie, flute; Haydn Draper, clarinet; and a string quartet led by George Woodhouse. The commentator Robert Philip comments that the recording lasts nine and a half minutes, substantially less than most later recordings, and "the Allegro sounds very fast to modern listeners (by comparison, a 1938 recording by Lily Laskine and the Calvet Quartet, for example, lasts just under eleven minutes)".

Among the many subsequent recordings are:

Ravel's arrangement of the piece for two pianos has been recorded (1990) by Louis Lortie and Hélène Mercier, and (2009) Tiziana Moneta and Gabriele Rota.

Notes, references and sources

Notes

References

Sources

External links
 

1905 compositions
Chamber music by Maurice Ravel
Compositions for septet
Compositions for harp
Compositions for flute
Compositions for clarinet
Compositions for string quartet
Compositions in G-flat major
Music with dedications